The People's Suffrage Federation (The PSF) was a British Adult Suffrage organisation. It was created by a merger of the Co-operative Women's Guild and the Women's Labour League in 1909—and led by Margaret Llewelyn Davies, who was the former Co-operative Women's Guild general secretary. The group believed that the Women's Suffrage movement was being damaged by class divisions, such as those that split the Women's Social and Political Union and the Women's Freedom League. They also thought that universal suffrage would be more popular with the liberal Government, as it was likely that voting rights only for privileged women would likely increase the conservative vote.

References 

Harold L Smith, The British Women's Suffrage Campaign, 1866–1928, Pearson Education Limited(1998), pg 28–29

1909 establishments in the United Kingdom
Organizations established in 1909
Women's organisations based in the United Kingdom